Łazienkowski Bridge is a five-span steel bridge, across the Vistula in Warsaw, Poland. It is 423 m long and 28 m wide, holding three lanes for vehicles each way, dedicated cycling lanes and sidewalks for pedestrians. The name refers to the Łazienki Park and Łazienki Palace, which are located to the south-west of the bridge.

The bridge was opened along with the Łazienkowska Thoroughfare on 22 July 1974, after three years' construction.

Since 1981 until 1998 the bridge was formally named  in honour of a Polish military commander who collaborated with the Soviet during World War II, but in practice, this name was almost never used.

Fire
Below the street level, the bridge has a service corridor, mainly for inspection, but also housing certain installations: medium voltage electricity, telecommunication fiberoptics, etc. Since its construction, this corridor had a wooden floor. Due to safety concerns, it was decided to replace all wood and other flammable materials with non-flammable ones. Ironically, on 14 February 2015, during replacement works, a fire broke out on the eastern bank, under the bridge where the dismantled materials were temporarily stored. The flames reached the bridge and set fire on yet-to-be-dismantled elements. Initially it was expected that the fire should not cause serious damage, however, post-fire examination revealed that the flame temperature reached 1000 °C and damaged the steel load-bearing elements enough that the bridge required a serious refurbishment, which cost 104 million złoty (about €25 million). It was reopened to the public on 20 October 2015.

See also
Poniatowski Bridge
Świętokrzyski Bridge
Siekierkowski Bridge

External links

 

Bridges completed in 1974
Bridges in Warsaw
Road bridges in Poland